Henriette Marie Eulalie Puig-Roget (9 January 1910 – 24 November 1992) was a French pianist, organist and music educator.

Biography 
Born in Bastia, she began her musical studies at the Conservatoire de Paris in 1919. She won 6 first prizes between 1926 and 1930 in the classes of Isidore Philipp, Jean Gallon and Noël Gallon, Maurice Emmanuel and Marcel Dupré: piano, harmony, music history, piano accompaniment, counterpoint, fugue, organ. She was also a student of Charles Tournemire in chamber music.

First Second Grand Prix de Rome in 1933, she was appointed the following year organist of the Oratoire du Louvre and the Grand Synagogue of Paris. She remained there until 1979 and 1952 respectively. As conductor of singing at the Opéra de Paris, she pursued a parallel career as a pianist on the radio from 1935, where she remained until 1975.

Henriette Roget, now Mrs. Ramon Puig-Vinyals, taught accompaniment at the Conservatoire de Paris from 1957. In 1979, she left to teach piano, music theory and chamber music at the Tokyo University of the Arts in Japan. Among her students from this Tokyo period were Kazuoki Fujii (pianist), Takenori Nemoto (French horn player), Hideki Nagano (pianist), Masakazu Natsuda (composer), Misato Mochizuki (composer) and Mami Sakato (organist).

References

External links 
 Hommage à Henriette Puyg-Roget
 Henriette Puyg-Roget on Discogs
 Henriette Puyg-Roget on Music sales classical
 Bulletins de l'association on France-orgue
 Henriette Puig-Roget-3 Haïkus-Brenda Poupard-Jean-Michel Kim on YouTube

20th-century French women classical pianists
French classical organists
20th-century French composers
Prix de Rome for composition
Conservatoire de Paris alumni
Academic staff of the Conservatoire de Paris
French music educators
People from Bastia
1910 births
1992 deaths
Women organists
20th-century organists
Women music educators
20th-century women composers